Charles Bridges (1794–1869) was a preacher and theologian in the Church of England, and a leader of that denomination's Evangelical Party. As a preacher he was well regarded by his contemporaries, but is remembered today for his literary contributions.

Education and ministry 

Educated at Queens' College, Cambridge, he was ordained in 1817 and served from 1823 to 1849 as vicar of Old Newton, Suffolk. Thomas Chalmers wrote,

In 1849, he became vicar of Weymouth, Dorset, later serving as vicar of Hinton Martell, Dorset (c. 1857). Bridges participated (with J. C. Ryle) in the Clerical Conference at Weston-super-Mare of 1858, and also participated in the consecration of the Bishop of Carlisle in York Minster in 1860.

Personal life 

Bridges was married to Harriet Torlesse, with whom he had at least two sons, the second of whom was physician John Henry Bridges, BA BM Oxon FRCP (1832–1906).

Literary works 

At least twenty-four editions of Bridges' Exposition of Psalm 119 (1827) were published in his lifetime. C. H. Spurgeon considered the commentary to be "worth its weight in gold". Spurgeon also pronounced Bridges' Exposition of Proverbs (1840) "The best work on the Proverbs".

Bibliography 

Exposition of Psalm 119 (1827)
The Christian Ministry (1829)
Memoir of Mary Jane Graham (c. 1834)
Forty-eight Scriptural Studies (1837)
Exposition of Proverbs (1840)
A Manual for the Young (1849)
Exposition of Ecclesiastes (1860)
Correspondence (posthumous, 1870)

References

External links 
 Exposition of Psalm 119
 The Christian Ministry
 A Memoir of Miss Mary Jane Graham
 Forty-eight Scriptural Studies
 Exposition of Proverbs
 Exposition of the Book of Ecclesiastes

1794 births
1869 deaths
English Anglican theologians
Evangelical Anglican theologians
Bible commentators
19th-century English Anglican priests
Alumni of Queens' College, Cambridge
19th-century English theologians
19th-century Anglican theologians